The ʿUmrah is an Islamic pilgrimage to Mecca (the holiest city for Muslims, located in the Hejazi region of Saudi Arabia) that can be undertaken at any time of the year, in contrast to the Ḥajj ("pilgrimage"), which has specific dates according to the Islamic lunar calendar. 

In accordance to the Shariah (Law of Islam), for both pilgrimages, a Muslim must first assume Ihram, a state of purification achieved by completing cleansing rituals, wearing the prescribed attire, and abstaining from certain actions. This must be attained when reaching a Miqat, a principal boundary point in Mecca, like Dhu 'l-Hulaifah, Juhfah, Qarnu 'l-Manāzil, Yalamlam, Zāt-i-'Irq, Ibrahīm Mursīyah, or a place in Al-Hill. Different conditions exist for air travelers, who must observe Ihram once entering a specific perimeter in the city. 

Umrah requires Muslims to perform two key rituals, Tawaf and Sa'i. Tawaf is a circling round the Kaaba seven times. For men, it is recommended to do the first three circuits in a hurried pace, followed by four rounds of a more leisurely pace. This is followed by Sa'i between Safa and Marwah in the Great Mosque of Mecca, a walk to commemorate Hagar's search for water for her son and God's mercy in answering prayers. Pilgrims conclude the pilgrimage with Halq, a partial or complete shortening of the hair.

Umrah is sometimes considered the "lesser pilgrimage", in that it is not compulsory in all Islam schools of thought, but is still highly recommended. It is mandatory according to the Hanbalis. It is generally able to be completed in a few hours, in comparison to Ḥajj, which may take a few days. It is also not meant to be interpreted as a substitute for Hajj. However, both are demonstrations of the solidarity of the Muslim people, and their submission to Allah (God).

Differences between the Hajj and Umrah
 Both are Islamic pilgrimages, the main difference is their level of importance and the method of observance.
 Hajj is one of the five pillars of Islam. It is obligatory for every Muslim once in their lifetime, provided they are physically fit and financially capable.
 Hajj is performed over specific days during a designated Islamic month. However, Umrah can be performed at any time.
 Although they share common rites, Umrah can be performed in less than a few hours while Hajj is more time-consuming, and involves more rituals.

Types
A certain type of the Umrah exists depending on whether or not the pilgrim wishes to perform Umrah in the Hajj period, thus combining their merit. When performed alongside the Hajj, Umrah is deemed one of "enjoyment" and is part of a fuller Hajj of enjoyment. More precisely, the rituals of the Umrah are performed first, and then the Hajj rituals are performed. Otherwise, when performed without continuing to perform Hajj, the Umrah is considered a "single" Umrah.

Rituals

The pilgrim performs a series of ritual acts symbolic of the lives of Ibrahim (Abraham) and his second wife Hajar, and of solidarity with Muslims worldwide. Pilgrims enter the perimeter of Mecca in a state of Ihram and perform:

Tawaf, Circumambulation of The  Kaaba In Worship. which consists of circling the Ka'bah seven times in an anticlockwise direction. Men are encouraged to make a small change of the ihram cloth, covering the left shoulder and opening the right shoulder. This is a recommended step done by Muhammad called idtiba. Muslims proceed to the Tawaf starting point (Hajar Al Aswad, The Black Stone). Muslims stand facing the Kaaba, raising their hands as in Salah & recite " Bismillahi Allahu Akbar", and start moving towards their right. For males the 1st three rounds are to be done at a hurried pace (called ramal), followed by four times, more closely, at a leisurely pace. Complete seven round in same manner.Sa'i, which means walking seven times back and forth between the hills of Safa and Marwah. Men are encouraged to walk fast in green light area. This is a re-enactment of Hajar's frantic search for water. The baby Isma'il (Ishmael) cried and hit the ground with his foot (some versions of the story say that an angel scraped his foot or the tip of his wing along the ground), and water miraculously sprang forth. This source of water is today called the Well of Zamzam.
 Halq or taqsir: Taqsir is a partial shortening of the hair typically reserved for women who cut a minimum of one inch or more of their hair. A halq is a complete shave of the head, usually performed on men. Both of these signify the submission of will to God over glorifying physical appearances. The head shaving/cutting is reserved until the end of Umrah.

These rituals complete the Umrah, and the pilgrim can choose to go out of ihram. Although not a part of the ritual, most pilgrims drink water from the Well of Zamzam. Various sects of Islam perform these rituals with slightly different methods. The peak times of pilgrimage are the days before, during and after the Hajj and during the last ten days of Ramadan.

History
According to the Muslim traditional accounts, access to the Holy Site (and thus the right to practice the Hajj and Umrah pilgrimages) have not always been granted to Muslims. It is reported in the Muslim traditional accounts that throughout Muhammad's era, the Muslims wanted to establish the right to perform Umrah and Hajj to Mecca since the latter had been prescribed by the Quran. During that time, Mecca was occupied by Arab Pagans who used to worship idols inside Mecca.

The Treaty of Hudaibiya
In the early years of the Islamic Ummah, it is claimed that tensions arose in Mecca between its pagan inhabitants and the Muslims who wished to perform pilgrimages within. According to the traditional Muslim stories, in 628 CE (6 AH), inspired by a dream that Muhammad had while in Madinah, in which he was performing the ceremonies of Umrah, he and his followers approached Mecca from Medina. They were stopped at Hudaibiya, Quraysh (a local tribe to which Muhammad belonged) refused entry to the Muslims who wished to perform the pilgrimage. Muhammad is said to have explained that they only wished to perform a pilgrimage, and subsequently leave the city, however the Qurayshites disagreed.

Diplomatic negotiations were pursued once the Islamic prophet Muhammad refused to use force to enter Mecca, out of respect to the Holy Ka'aba. In March, 628 CE (Dhu'l-Qi'dah, 6 AH), the Treaty of Hudaybiyyah was drawn up and signed, with terms stipulating a ten-year period free of hostilities, during which the Muslims would be allowed a three-day-long access per year to the holy site of the Ka'aba starting the following year. On the year it was signed, the followers of Mohammed were forced to return home without having performed Umrah.

The First Umrah
The next year (629 CE, or 7 AH), the Muslim tradition claims that Muhammad ordered and took part in the Conquest of Mecca in December 629. Following the agreed-upon terms of the Hudaibiya Treaty, Muhammad and some 2000 followers (men, women and children) proceeded to perform what became the first Umrah, which lasted three days. After the transfer of power, the people of Mecca who (according to the Muslim traditional narrative) had persecuted and driven away the early Muslims, and had fought against the Muslims due to their beliefs, were afraid of retribution. However, Muhammad forgave all of his former enemies.

Ten people were forgiven, and not to be killed after the capture of Mecca: Ikrimah ibn Abi-Jahl, Abdullah ibn Saad ibn Abi Sarh, Habbar bin Aswad, Miqyas Subabah Laythi, Huwairath bin Nuqayd, Abdullah Hilal and four women who had been guilty of murder or other offences or had sparked off the war and disrupted the peace.

Coronavirus closings
On 26 February 2020, Saudi Arabia suspended travel to the country for reasons related to the Umrah, due to concerns over the rapid spread of coronavirus. After the reporting of the first case of coronavirus in Saudi Arabia, on 4 March 2020, the Riyadh government banned Umrah pilgrimage to the holy cities of Medina and Mecca for Saudi citizens and residents living in the kingdom. On 10 August 2021, Umrah for pilgrims coming from around the world was resumed.

See also

Arabian peninsula
List of expeditions of Muhammad
Umrah visa policy

References

External links
How to Perform Umrah (YouTube)
Perform Umrah 

Islamic pilgrimages
Arabic words and phrases
History of Mecca
Islamic worship
Hajj terminology